Ishqaway is a 2015 Pakistani drama television series directed by Ali Faizan, produced by Babar Javed, and written by Maira Sajid. The drama stars Sami Khan, Rabab Hashim, and Sonia Mishal in lead roles and first aired on 27 July 2015 on Geo Entertainment. The series aired every Monday and Tuesday at 9:00 P.M and also aired on the Indian channel Zindagi under the same title.

Series overview

Haim and Amaal  are pressured into marrying each other, but Haim finds himself falling for Amaal's best friend, Saafina. Does Haim respect his family's wishes or pursue Saafina?

Cast and characters

 Sami Khan as Haim
 Sonia Mishal as Amaal
 Rabab Hashim as Safinaa
 Qavi Khan
 Ghana Ali
 Hammad Farooqui as Nail
 Zainab Ahmed
 Munazzah Arif as Almas
 Hashim Butt
 Sophia Ahmed
 Naima Khan
 Haseeb Khan
 Sumbul Shahid as Safinaa's mother
 Imran Ahmed
 Areeba Ali
 Rohail Haider
 Shabana Kanwal
 Tanveer Malik
 Zafar Abbas
 Adla Khan
 Safdar Gondal

References

2015 Pakistani television series debuts
2015 Pakistani television series endings
Urdu-language television shows
Pakistani drama television series